Austin Edward Walsh (September 1, 1891 – January 26, 1955) was a left fielder for the Chicago Federals professional baseball team in 1914.

References

External links

1891 births
1955 deaths
Major League Baseball left fielders
Chicago Whales players
Baseball players from Massachusetts
Galesburg Pavers players
Green Bay Bays players
Ottumwa Packers players
Rock Island Islanders players